Umberto Eusepi (born 9 January 1989) is an Italian professional footballer who plays as a striker for  club Lecco.

Club career
In summer 2010 Genoa sold Eusepi to Varese in a co-ownership deal for a peppercorn fee of €500.

On 6 August 2019, he joined Alessandria on loan. On 1 September 2020, he moved to Alessandria on a permanent basis. On 31 August 2021, he was loaned to Juve Stabia.

On 27 August 2022, Eusepi signed a two-year contract with Lecco.

International career
He represented Italy at the 2008 UEFA European Under-19 Football Championship, where they came second, and at the 2009 FIFA U-20 World Cup.

References

External links
 

1989 births
Living people
People from Tivoli, Lazio
Footballers from Lazio
Italian footballers
Association football forwards
Serie B players
Serie C players
Genoa C.F.C. players
A.C. Ancona players
A.C. Reggiana 1919 players
F.C. Esperia Viareggio players
S.S.D. Varese Calcio players
F.C. Pavia players
A.C. Carpi players
F.C. Pro Vercelli 1892 players
A.C. Perugia Calcio players
Benevento Calcio players
U.S. Salernitana 1919 players
Pisa S.C. players
U.S. Avellino 1912 players
Novara F.C. players
U.S. Alessandria Calcio 1912 players
S.S. Juve Stabia players
Calcio Lecco 1912 players
Italy youth international footballers
Sportspeople from the Metropolitan City of Rome Capital